Carmen Amato is an American mystery and thriller author of Italian descent, best known for the Detective Emilia Cruz police procedural series set in Acapulco, as well as the standalone political thriller, The Hidden Light of Mexico City.  Her work is based on thirty years experience with the CIA and her relocation to Mexico.

Works

 The Hidden Light of Mexico City, 2011
 Made in Acapulco, 2012 (collection of short stories)
 Cliff Diver, 2013
 Hat Dance, 2013
 Diablo Nights, 2014
 King Peso, 2016
 Awakening Macbeth, 2017
 Pacific Reaper, 2017
 Insider's Guide to the Best of Mexico, 2017
 43 Missing, 2018
 The Artist, 2018 (illustrated short story)
 Narco Noir, 2021
 Insider's Guide to the Best of Mexican Holidays, 2021
 Murder at the Galliano Club, 2022
 Blackmail at the Galliano Club, 2023
 Revenge at the Galliano Club, 2023

References

Year of birth missing (living people)
Living people
21st-century American novelists
21st-century American short story writers
American mystery novelists
American thriller writers
American women novelists
American women short story writers
Place of birth missing (living people)
Women mystery writers
Novelists from New York (state)
Women thriller writers
21st-century American women writers